Soul'd Out is the independently released debut album by American recording artist Chris Rene.  Rene is best known for being a part of the inaugural season of U.S. version of The X Factor, finishing in third place. The album was released on July 21, 2009, made available for physical and digital purchase.

Track listing 
Track listing provided by AllMusic.

Sample credits
"Gangster of Love" contains a sample of "(If Loving You Is Wrong) I Don't Want to Be Right" as performed by Luther Ingram, and written by Homer Banks, Carl Hampton and Raymond Jackson.
Notes
All songs produced by Chris Rene except "S.C. to L.A." produced by Keem Beats.

Personnel

Musicians 
 Chris Rene - vocals

Production 
 Chris Rene - producer
 Keem Beats - producer
 Weedy G - engineer
 Aldoja - engineer
 Ghambit - engineer

References

External links
 

2009 debut albums
Chris Rene albums